The  was a professional wrestling championship in the Japanese promotion DDT Pro-Wrestling. The title was established in 2009 in DDT's parodic sub-brand New Beijing Pro-Wrestling. The belt was made from cardboard and was supposedly over 4,000 years old.

Title history
In storyline, this title was over 4,000 years old and Choun Shiryu was introduced as the 4,823rd champion. Danshoku Dino captured the title at What Are You Doing? 2009, on July 19. He then defended it at Ryōgoku Peter Pan on August 23 against Masa Takanashi. The title was then unified with Dino's DDT Extreme Championship.

Reigns

See also

DDT Pro-Wrestling
Professional wrestling in Japan

References

DDT Pro-Wrestling championships
Openweight wrestling championships